Red Star Football Club, also known simply as Red Star, is a French association football club founded in Paris in 1897, and is the fourth oldest French football club, after Standard AC of Paris, Le Havre AC and Girondins de Bordeaux. In the 2019–20 season the club plays in the Championnat National, the French third tier, after being relegated from Ligue 2 at the end of the 2018–19 season. It plays matches at Stade Bauer. The team is managed by Habib Beye.

Despite the club's long spell under a semi-pro status, Red Star has a rich history. The club was founded in 1897 under the name Red Star Club Français by French football legend Jules Rimet. Rimet later went on to serve as president of both the French Football Federation and FIFA. The original FIFA World Cup Trophy was named in his honour. Red Star was one of the founding member clubs of Ligue 1 and has spent 19 seasons in the first division; the club's last top tier stint being in 1974–75. In cup competitions, the club has won five Coupe de France titles, which is tied for fifth-best among all French clubs.

While the club have enjoyed only modest success on the field, the club is widely recognised for its distinctive social culture. Red Star supporters are strongly identified with their support of left-wing politics, social activism and a party atmosphere they create at the club's matches.

The club was purchased by US-based private investment firm 777 Partners in May 2022, a move which saw demonstrations from fans leading to the postponement of a Championnat National match in April 2022.

History
Red Star Football Club was founded on 21 February 1897 in a Parisian café by Jules Rimet and Ernest Weber under the name Red Star Club Français. The derivation of the name is uncertain; it is possibly taken from the red star of Buffalo Bill or possibly in reference to Miss Jenny, a British governess based in Paris who was adopted as the godmother of the club, who recommended the club be named after the historic shipping line, the Red Star Line. Upon its creation, Rimet installed Jean de Piessac as club president and one of his younger brothers as club secretary. The club was officially inaugurated on 12 March 1897 after Rimet signed the club's statutes and sent them to the USFSA, which, during this time, served as the head of French football. Members of the club were required to pay ₣100 a month to help the club meet its daily quota. Red Star officially joined the USFSA in 1898 and was inserted into the third-tier of the association's football league system. In the club's infancy, the team played in navy blue and white at the Champ de Mars. However, soon after, Red Star moved to Meudon playing on a terrace overlooking the Seine Valley. Midway through the year, de Piessac left his post as club president. Rimet quickly succeeded him and, by 1904, Red Star were playing in the first division of the USFSA league.

In 1907, Red Star changed its name to Red Star Amical Club after merging with Amical Football Club. Due to the merger, the club departed Meudon and moved to Grenelle. After three years in Grenelle, the club moved to Saint-Ouen in Seine-Saint-Denis to play in the newly built Stade de Paris. On 25 October 1909, the stadium was inaugurated following a match between Red Star and English club Old Westminsters. The stadium was later renamed to its present name today. With the USFSA becoming disorganised in the early 1900s, Red Star joined the newly created Ligue de Football Association (LFA) in 1910. In 1912, the club earned its first honour after winning the association's Ligue Nationale. In the same year, the club also finished runner-up to Étoile des Deux Lacs in the Trophée de France.

In 1919, the French Football Federation was created and months later, the Coupe de France. From 1920–34, Red Star embarked on a remarkable uprising in which the club won four Coupe de France titles, achieved professional status, and were founding members of the French Division 1. The club's first Coupe de France victory came in 1921, when the club, led by French internationals Pierre Chayriguès, Paul Nicolas, Juste Brouzes, Lucien Gamblin and Maurice Meyer, defeated Olympique de Paris 2–1, courtesy of goals from Marcel Naudin and Robert Clavel. In the ensuing two seasons, Red Star won back-to-back Coupe de France titles. In 1922, the club defeated Stade Rennais UC 2–0 and, in 1923, Red Star beat Cette 4–2 to complete the hat trick. In 1926, Red Star completed a second merger, this time with its local rivals Olympique de Paris whom it had defeated just five years ago in a Coupe de France final. Due to the merger, Red Star changed its name to Red Star Olympique and dropped its navy blue and white combination for a simple white blouse. In 1928, Red Star won its fourth Coupe de France title of the decade defeating CA Paris 3–1 at the Stade Olympique Yves-du-Manoir in Colombes.

In July 1930, the National Council of the French Football Federation voted 128–20 in support of professionalism in French football. Red Star were among the first clubs to adopt the new statute and, subsequently, became professional and were founding members of the new league. In the league's inaugural season, Red Star were relegated after finishing in the bottom three of its group. As a result, the club played the following season in the inaugural season of the Division 2. Red Star won the league and returned to the first division for the 1934–35 season. Following the club's return to Division 1, Red Star switched its colours from white to the green and white that exists today. In 1967, they merged with Toulouse FC (not the current club) out of the latter club's financial reasons and bought Toulouse's place in the top division. The merged club last played in first division in the 1974–75 season.

After a long spell in the lower leagues, following a successful 2014–15 campaign, the team won promotion to Ligue 2, the second tier of French football.

In their first season back in Ligue 2, Red Star finished 5th on the table missing promotion to Ligue 1 by a single point. In the 2016–17 Ligue 2 season, Red Star finished 19th and were relegated back to the third division of French football.

Due to safety regulation issues with Stade Bauer, Red Star has been forced to play at different stadiums the past few seasons when in Ligue 2. They have employed Stade Jean-Bouin in the past and then used Stade Pierre Brisson located in Beauvais. Since returning to the third tier in 2019, the club has returned to playing home matches at Stade Bauer.

In 2018, Red Star were promoted back to Ligue 2 as champions of the Championnat National. They were relegated again the following season, finishing bottom of Ligue 2. Their relegation was confirmed on 27 April 2019 after losing 2–1 to champions FC Metz.

Divisional Movements of Red Star
(Italics indicates winning seasons)
 Ligue 1: 1932–33, 1934–38, 1939–50, 1965–66, 1967–73, 1974–75
 Ligue 2: 1933–34, 1938–39, 1952–60, 1961–65, 1966–67, 1973–74, 1975–78, 1982–87, 1989–99, 2015–17, 2018–19
 Third Level: 1950–52, 1960–61, 1981–82, 1987–89, 1999–01, 2011–15, 2017–18, 2019–
 Fourth Level: 1980–81, 2001–02, 2006–11
 Fifth Level: 1978–80, 2002–03, 2005–06
 Sixth Level: 2003–05

Name Changes
 Red Star Club Français (1897–04)
 Red Star Amical Club (1904–25)
 Red Star Olympique (1925–44)
 Red Star Olympique Audonien (1944–46)
 Stade Français-Red Star (1946–48)
 Red Star Olympique Audonien (1948–55)
 Red Star Football Club (1955–66)
 AS Red Star (1976–82)
 AS Red Star 93 (1982–01)
 Red Star Football Club 93 (2001–10)
 Red Star Football Club (2010–)

Supporters
The club has relatively modest but loyal support, mostly centered around Saint-Ouen and the northern suburbs of Paris. Overtly antifascist, most of the fans are left-wing, and the club identifies itself as a banlieue working-class club. Attendances usually oscillate between 1,000 and 2,000 spectators per match.

The club has several ultras groups; "Red Star Fans", "Gang Green", "Perry Boys" and the smaller "Splif Brothers".

The fans have a long-standing friendship with "Red Kaos" of Grenoble.

Red Star have rivalries with fellow Parisian derby rivals; with US Créteil and a fierce rivalry with Paris FC.

Youth system
Red Star unearthed several talented players during its early existence, most notably Paul Nicolas, who spent nine years at the club, Nicolas later became a catalyst towards the development of professional football in France and was partly responsible for the creation of the Ligue de Football Professionnel. Football manager Roger Lemerre started his managerial career with the club before leading France to titles at UEFA Euro 2000 and the 2001 FIFA Confederations Cup.

Red Star's youth academy was once very productive. The likes of Alex Song, Moussa Sissoko and Abou Diaby, all renowned players in English football, came through the club's youth system. As a matter of fact, no less than five players at the 2014 World Cup had played in the club's youth teams. Nevertheless, during the years spent in lower amateur divisions, the loss of professional status led to the dismantling of the youth academy setup, and although a project to rebuild it has been in the air for a few years, it has yet to be done despite the club's return to professional football.

Players

Current squad

Notable players
Below are the notable former players who have represented Red Star in league and international competition since the club's foundation in 1897. To appear in the section below, a player must have played in at least 100 official matches for the club or have played for his country's team.

For a complete list of Red Star players, see :Category:Red Star F.C. players.

 Alfred Aston
 David Bellion
 Philippe Bonnardel
 Jean-Claude Bras
 Juste Brouzes
 Augustin Chantrel
 Pierre Chayriguès
 Émilien Devic
 Marcel Domergue
 Lucien Gamblin
 Alfred Gindrat
 Jean-Luc Girard
 François Hugues
 Eugène Langenove
 Nasser Bouiche
 Christian Laudu
 Eugène Maës
 Steve Marlet
 Guilherme Mauricio
 Georges Meuris
 Maurice Meyer
 Pol Morel
 Paul Nicolas
 Marcel Pinel
 Julien Du Rhéart
 Jacky Simon
 André Simonyi
 Georges Stuttler
 Peppe Moncef Chahboune
 Alexis Thépot
 Julien Verbrugge
 Lotfi Guellati 
 Nestor Combin
 Guillermo Stábile
 Helenio Herrera
 Yves Desmarets
 Stéphan Raheriharimanana
 Bror Mellberg
 Hugo Pérez
 Aleksandr Bubnov
 Fyodor Cherenkov
 Safet Sušić

Management and staff
Owner and President: Patrice Haddad
Head Coach: Habib Beye
Assistant Coach: Vincent Doukantie

Coaching history

Honours

Domestic

Ligue 2
Champions (2): 1933–34, 1938–39
Championnat National
Champions (2): 2014–15, 2017–18
Championnat de France amateur 2
Champions (1): 2006 (Group A)
Division d'Honneur (Paris Île-de-France)
Champions (4): 1920, 1922, 1924, 2005
Coupe de France
Champions (5): 1921, 1922, 1923, 1928, 1942
Runners-up (1): 1946

Other
Ligue de Football Association (LFA) Championship
Champions (1): 1912
Challenge de la Renommée
Champions (1): 1919
Trophée de France
Runners-up (1): 1912

International
Tournoi du Nouvel An
Winners (2): 1921 (shared), 1923, 1924 (shared)
Tournoi de Pâques
Winners (1): 1923
Runners-up (2): 1922, 1929
Tournoi Pascal
Winners (2): 1913, 1924
Challenge International de Paris
Winners (1): 1913
Tournoi de Pentecôte
Runners-up (1): 1927

References

External links
 Official website

 
Football clubs in Paris
Association football clubs established in 1897
1897 establishments in France
Sport in Seine-Saint-Denis
Ligue 1 clubs
2022 mergers and acquisitions